The 1942 Florida Gators football team represented the University of Florida during the 1942 college football season. The season was Tom Lieb's third as Florida's head coach. By the autumn of 1942, World War II had begun to affect many college football programs. Florida lost several players and most of its coaching staff to the war effort before the season, and lost several more players during the season, leading to diminishing success as the schedule progressed.

The Gators began the season 3–1 but lost their final six contests to finish with a 3–7 overall record. Their 1–3 conference record placed ninth among twelve teams in the SEC.

Schedule

References

Florida
Florida Gators football seasons
Florida Gators football